Tajja Isen (born June 29, 1991) is a Canadian writer, editor, and voice actress. Her first book, the essay collection Some of My Best Friends: Essays on Lip Service, was published in April 2022. As an actress, she is best known for voicing the title character in the television series Atomic Betty. She has several other voice credits, including the voice of Samantha in Franklin and the Turtle Lake Treasure, Jane in Jane and the Dragon, Jodie in Time Warp Trio, Sister Bear in The Berenstain Bears, Franny's singing voice in Franny's Feet, Jazzi in The Save-Ums!, and Princess Pea/Presto in the PBS Kids show Super Why!.

Biography
Isen was born in Toronto, Ontario. At 10 years old, she began her voice acting career with The Berenstain Bears, where she voiced Sister Bear.' In 2004, she portrayed Young Nala in a Toronto production of Disney's The Lion King and was nominated for an Equity Emerging Artist Award for that role.

Her first book, Some of My Best Friends: Essays on Lip Service, was released in 2022 from Atria/One Signal Publishers in the U.S., and from Doubleday Canada in the north of the border. She is the editor-in-chief of Catapult magazine.

Personal life and family
Isen is of mixed Trinidadian descent. Her younger sister Nissae Isen is also a voice actress.

Discography
 Atomic Betty (2005)

Selected filmography

Animation
List of voice performances in animation

Live-action roles

Movies

Awards 

2004 – Young Artist Awards- Best Performance in a Voice-Over Role – Nominated (Berenstain Bears)
2007 – Young Artist Awards- Best Performance in a Voice-Over Role – Won (Jane and the Dragon)
2009 – Gemini Awards- Best Individual or Ensemble Performance in an Animated Television Show or Series – Won (Atomic Betty)

References

External links
 

1991 births
Living people
Actresses from Toronto
Canadian child actresses
Canadian musical theatre actresses
Canadian people of Trinidad and Tobago descent
Canadian voice actresses
Canadian women essayists
Black Canadian actresses
21st-century Canadian essayists
21st-century Canadian women writers